Taipei Songshan Airport  is a regional airport and military airbase located in Songshan District, Taipei, Taiwan.

The civilian section of Songshan Airport has scheduled flights to domestic destinations in Taiwan and international destinations including Seoul, Tokyo, and select cities in mainland China. Songshan serves only a small portion of the international flights for Taipei compared to the larger Taoyuan International Airport. Songshan Airport is also the base of certain Republic of China Air Force units as part of the Songshan Air Force Base. The Songshan Base Command's main mission is to serve the President and Vice President of the Republic of China.

History

After World War II, in 1946, it was taken over by the Republic of China Air Force. Before the end of the Chinese Civil War and the establishment of the People's Republic of China, the airport provided flight routes between Shanghai and Taipei, occasionally via Fuzhou.

Shared military and civilian use—both domestic and international—began on 16 April 1950 in the reconstructed Civil Aeronautics Administration Taipei Airport. Domestic destinations have been Kaohsiung, Hualien, Taichung, Penghu, and Tainan. The first international destinations were Seattle, Tokyo, Busan, Manila, Bangkok, and Hong Kong. The first international airlines included Northwest Airlines, Pan Am, and Hong Kong Airways (now Cathay Pacific). Later, the airport became too small to handle an increased number of passengers, even after a series of expansions. This later worsened when new wide-body jets became common at the airport. Therefore, all international activities were relocated to Taoyuan International Airport (then known as Chiang Kai-shek International) after its inauguration on 26 February 1979. Consequently, the passenger load at the airport dropped from 6.2 million in 1978 to 2.9 million in 1979 (a 53% decrease). At its peak in 1997, the airport handled over 15.3 million passengers annually.

Service to Taichung and Chiayi was stopped in mid-2007 after the load factor dropped significantly due to the Taiwan High Speed Rail's start of revenue service in January 2007. Passenger volume decreased from 6.7 million in 2006 to 4.4 million in 2007 (a 34% decrease). Also due to the opening of the high speed rail line, on 1 March 2008, Uni Air suspended its service to Kaohsiung, while Far Eastern Air Transport suspended its service to Tainan. TransAsia Airways decided to stop flights to Tainan and Kaohsiung after 1 August 2008.

In early 1999 when the construction of Taipei 101 had just started, Taiwan's Civil Aeronautics Administration changed this airport's certain SID and STAR procedures to avoid possible collision with the building. The 677-meter  was constructed between 1997 and 2006 under this airport's runway to link the north and south side of this airport.

Regular cross-Strait charter flights to China started on 4 July 2008, with Songshan receiving the majority of flights. Direct flights to China were an issue of contention. Then-mayor Ma Ying-jeou had been pressing to make Songshan Airport Taipei's main International terminal, citing that its location close to the city center would make it preferable for business travelers. However, building height restrictions around the airport raised concerns about flight safety, blocking of radio communications, noise pollution, and a reduced number of flights.

The continuing growth of Taipei City means that Songshan airport is situated in the heart of downtown Taipei. Compared to Taiwan Taoyuan International Airport, Songshan Airport saves travelers about 30 minutes due to its location inside Taipei City's central business district, but the city suffers from the noise, pollution, restrictions on urban planning, and traffic congestion the airport brings about. In the 2002 and 2006 Taipei Mayor Election DPP candidates Lee Ying-yuan and Frank Hsieh both proposed the plan to close Songshan Airport, and developed its land into road, huge park, detention basin and sports arena, since the Taiwan High Speed Rail could quickly take up the traffic load between Taipei and western Taiwan cities, and the remaining service to outlying islands and eastern Taiwan could be easily taken over by the Taiwan Taoyuan International Airport after the completion of the Taoyuan International Airport Access MRT System by the end of 2016. Also, the MRT system will make the international potential of Songshan airport less attractive. The Songshan Airport closing proposal was deferred under the Taipei City Government which has long been dominated by the Pan-Blue Coalition, who prefers the downtown airport connection concept with Shanghai, Seoul, and Tokyo.

Due to the introduction of Taiwan-China flights and future international potential, the airport is undergoing extensive renovations, the first phase of which is expected to be completed by October 2010. The second and third phase renovations are expected to be completed by March and October 2011, respectively. However, as of November 2011 renovations are still in progress. A new international cargo terminal is being built in anticipation of a new air route between Taiwan and Japan. The unused Terminal 2 was refurbished to accommodate arriving flights while the main Terminal, now Terminal 1, was rearranged to handle increased passenger traffic. On 29 March 2011, the renovated Terminal 2 was re-opened to handle domestic flights.

International potential

Similar to London–City, Milan–Linate, and Toronto–Billy Bishop airports, Songshan Airport is seen to have the potential to attract business travellers within Pacific Asia due to its location in downtown Taipei. Flights to Bangkok–Don Mueang, Jakarta–Halim Perdanakusuma, Kuala Lumpur–Subang, Nagoya–Komaki, Osaka–Itami, Seoul–Gimpo, Singapore–Seletar, Shanghai–Hongqiao, and Tokyo–Haneda are especially attractive since these airports are also in the central areas of their respective cities, and all these cities have larger far flung international airports. The airport is currently in the process of expansion to better accommodate international flights.

On 6 March 2009, Japan and Taiwan signed a Memorandum of Understanding on the revision of Taiwan–Japan bilateral traffic. Four carriers (EVA Air, China Airlines, Japan Airlines, and All Nippon Airways) would be able to operate from Songshan Airport to Tokyo–Haneda. In December 2009, an affirmative schedule for the route between Tokyo–Haneda and Taipei–Songshan was announced. Starting in October 2010, EVA Air, China Airlines, Japan Airlines, and All Nippon Airways each operates two flights a day from Taipei–Songshan to Tokyo–Haneda, with China Airlines and EVA Air both utilizing the Airbus Airbus A330-300 on the route. All Nippon Airways and Japan Airlines began this route with the Boeing 767-300ER, but have phased in the newer Boeing 787-8 on the route beginning in 2013 and 2014, respectively. Japan Airlines also uses the Boeing 777-200ER on this route.

On 14 June 2010, direct flights between Taipei–Songshan and Shanghai–Hongqiao began. Each week has 28 flights, served by China Eastern Airlines, Shanghai Airlines, Air China, China Airlines, EVA Air, and TransAsia Airways. The airport will undergo upgrades to its runway and reduce its jet bridges from eight to six to accommodate wider contemporary aircraft such as the Airbus A330 and Boeing 767.

Airlines and destinations

Passenger

Traffic and statistics
In 2018, Songshan Airport handled 6,225,932 passengers and 47,132.9 tons of cargo. The route between Taipei Songshan and Kinmen is the busiest domestic route in Taiwan, with 1,267,630 travelers in 2018. In 2018, the ten routes with the largest number of passengers are as follows:

Ground transportation

Rail
The airport is served by the Songshan Airport metro station on the Wenhu line of the Taipei Metro. The TRA Songshan Airport Line also formerly served Songshan Airport from 1936 until 1976.

Bus
Several city buses also serve this airport, providing frequent links to the Tamsui Line and Wenshan Line of the Taipei Metro.

Accidents and incidents
On 23 October 1944, a Japanese passenger transport plane crashed into the Taiwan Grand Shrine on Jiantan Mountain shortly after take-off from then Matsuyama Airfield. Many parts of the shrine, including the Torii ceremonial archway and stone toro lanterns, were damaged in the crash.
On 18 August 1945, a Japanese Type 97 Heavy Bomber departing for Dalian failed to take-off and crashed into flames. Subhas Chandra Bose and Lt. Gen. Tsunamasa Shidei of Imperial Japanese Army are killed in this accident.
On 20 February 1970, Douglas DC-3 B-243 of Far Eastern Air Transport crashed into a mountain shortly after take-off. The aircraft was operating a cargo flight, both crew were killed.
On August 12, 1970, China Airlines Flight 206 crashed at the airport in a CFIT accident.
On 7 October 1974, a Vickers Viscount of Far Eastern Air Transport was the subject of an attempted hijacking. The hijacker was overpowered and the aircraft landed at its intended destination of Taipei Songshan Airport.
On 1 February 1975, Vickers Viscount PK-RVM of Mandala Airlines was damaged beyond economic repair when it overran the runway.
On 31 July 1975, Vickers Viscount B-2029 of Far Eastern Air Transport crashed killing 27 of the 75 people on board.
On 22 August 1981, Boeing 737-200 of Far Eastern Air Transport broke up after takeoff from Songshan, killing everyone on board.
On 10 October 1997, a Republic of China Air Force C-130 Hercules 1310, c/n 5067, delivered October 1986, same August 1996. The aircraft crashed during an attempted go-around killing all 5 on board.
On 4 February 2015, TransAsia Airways Flight 235, an ATR 72-600 (B-22816), crashed shortly after takeoff from Taipei Songshan Airport, first clipping a taxi and then crashing into Keelung River near Taipei. Of the 53 passengers and 5 crew members, 43 were killed.

See also
 Civil Aeronautics Administration (Taiwan)
 Transportation in Taiwan
 List of airports in Taiwan

References

External links

 
 

Airports in Taiwan
Airports established in 1936
Transportation in Taipei
Buildings and structures in Taipei
1936 establishments in Taiwan